Arcadia is a 2012 American drama film written and directed by Olivia Silver, produced by A Poisson Rouge Pictures and DViant Films. It won the Crystal Bears, Generation Kplus at 2012 Berlinale and the Grand Prize at the Cine Junior Festival.

Premise
Twelve-year-old Greta's dad Tom is moving the kids cross-country, promising a California paradise and packing half the household into a dented station wagon. Mom is supposed to join them later. But as they travel through forests, plains and deserts, stopping at fast food joints, shoddy motels, and a poor substitute for the Grand Canyon, Greta gradually realizes that her family is falling apart.

Cast
 John Hawkes as Tom
 Ryan Simpkins as Greta
 Ty Simpkins as Nat
 Kendall Toole as Caroline

Critical reception
Arcadia scored highly with critics, and played to sold out theaters at the Berlin Film Festival. Manohla Dargis of The New York Times wrote: "Ms. Silver’s ability to translate the liminal into cinematic terms, to catch those moments between innocence and knowing, childhood and adulthood, unforgiving and forgiving, makes her someone to watch".

Awards and nominations
 62nd Berlin International Film Festival
 Crystal Bear, Generation Kplus
 23rd Cine Junior Festival
 Grand Prize at the Cine Junior Festival
 "Grain à Démoudre" Prize (from young people aged 10–25 years)
 13th Woodstock Film Festival
 Official selection

References

External links

2012 films
2010s drama road movies
American drama road movies
American independent films
2012 independent films
Films about dysfunctional families
Films shot in California
Films set in the United States
Films set in the 2010s
2012 directorial debut films
2012 drama films
2010s English-language films
2010s American films